Charlie's Colorforms City is a children's streaming television series created by Angela Santomero, based on Colorforms, and presented by Tyler Maxwell. The show educates children about colors, shapes, and size; the show is co-produced for Netflix by 9 Story USA and IoM Media Ventures (formerly DHX Studios Halifax). The series premiered on Netflix on March 22, 2019, with Season 1 consisting of 13 episodes. Several new episodes (marketed as 3 additional seasons) were released on November 30, 2021. Another 11 episodes (marketed as 2 seasons) were released on June 13, 2022.

American Cast
 Jacob Soley - Charlie
 Saara Chaudry - Violet
 Tyler Barish - Red
 Caleb Bellavance - Red (Season 2)
 Zoe Hatz - Miss Weather
 Joseph Motiki - OctoBocto, An Athletic Silly Face, A Clumsy Silly Face
 Julie Lemieux - A Baby Silly Face, A Loud Silly Face, A Space Silly Face, Chicken
 Shoshana Sperling - A Grandma Silly Face, A Police Silly Face, A Woman Police Silly Face, Mermaid 2
 John Davie - Klunk
 Stacey DePass - Dragon, Brother Dragon, A Kid Silly Face
 Adrianna Di Liello - Star
 Bryn McAuley - Marina the Mermaid, A Yoga Instructor Silly Face
 Ethan Pugiotto - Harley
 Nissae Isen - Baby Elephant
 Deann DeGruijter - Rock Star Beach Ball Fish
 Bianca Alongi - MacGuffin
 Michela Luci - Yetilda
 Rick Miller - A Business Silly Face, A Construction Silly Face
 Wyatt Boston White - Humpty
 Giovanni Conconi - Voz cantada de rojo

The series has also been dubbed into several other languages including British English, French and Polish.

Episodes

Season 1
 Charlie the Pancake Chef/Starry Charlie
 Rock Star Charlie/Birthday Charlie
 Racer Charlie/Knight Charlie
 Adventurer Charlie/Charlie's Pet
 Silliest Charlie/Mystery Charlie
 Charlie's Sleepover/Charlie's Little Brother
 Weather Charlie/Charlie Gets Big
 Spooky Charlie/Charlie Is Super
 Charlie's Space Mission/Sporty Charlie
 Charlie's Surprise/Treasure Hunter Charlie
 Charlie the Cowboy/Charlie Is an Inventor
 Mechanic Charlie/Charlie Is a Pirate
 Sick Charlie/Charlie's Restaurant

Season 2
 The Lost Valentines Musical: Charlie and the Lost Valentines

Season 3
 Snowy Stories: Charlie and the Snowy Day / Charlie and Yeti Mountain

Season 4
 Charlie and Happy Humpty
 Charlie and Octo-Bocto-rella
 Charlie Red Riding Hood
 Charlie and the Itsy Bitsy Spider
 Charlie's Hairytale Fairytale Salon
 Charlie and Little Bo Peep
 Charlie on Jack and Jill Hill
 Charlie and the Three Little Space Pigs

Season 5
 Charlie and the Lightning Hiccups
 Charlie and the Magic Story Star
 Charlie Goes Surfing
 Charlie Goes Camping
 Charlie's Game Night
 Construction Worker Charlie
 Charlie Meets Planty
 Charlie's Birthday Bus Ride

Season 6
 Charlie's Super Movie Adventure
 Charlie's Dinosaur Movie Adventure
 Charlie's Robot Space Movie Adventure

References

External links
 Charlie's Colorforms City at Netflix
 Charlie's Colorforms City at IMDb

2010s American animated television series
2010s Canadian animated television series
2019 American television series debuts
2019 American television series endings
2019 Canadian television series debuts
2019 Canadian television series endings
American children's animated adventure television series
American children's animated fantasy television series
American computer-animated television series
American preschool education television series
Animated television series about children
Canadian children's animated adventure television series
Canadian children's animated fantasy television series
Canadian computer-animated television series
Canadian preschool education television series
Netflix children's programming
English-language Netflix original programming
Television series by WildBrain
Animated television series by Netflix
Television series by 9 Story Media Group
Television series created by Angela Santomero
Animated preschool education television series
2010s preschool education television series